Georg or George Rosen may refer to:

 Georg Rosen (1821–1891), German Orientalist and diplomat
 Georg Rosen (1895–1961), his grandson, German lawyer and diplomat
 Georg von Rosen (1843–1923), Swedish painter
 George Rosen (physician) (1910–1977), American physician and public health administrator